Sebastian Philip Bierk (born April 3, 1968), known professionally as Sebastian Bach, is a Canadian-American singer who achieved mainstream success as the frontman of the hard rock band Skid Row from 1987 to 1996. He has acted on Broadway and has made appearances in film and television such as Trailer Park Boys and Gilmore Girls. He continues his music career as a solo artist.

Early years 
Bach was born in the Bahamas and was raised in Peterborough, Ontario. He is one of eight children. His brother Zac Bierk is a retired ice hockey player.

His father, David Bierk (d. 2002), was a noted painter. He painted one of Skid Row's album covers and inside cover art on another band album, and an album cover for one of Bach's solo records, and inside art for another solo effort.

Bach became confident of his ability to sing partly from listening to his mother and aunt sing informally at home and feeling joyful when he heard them.

He also joined a church choir when he was eight years old, and found much joy in singing "Gloria in Excelsis Deo" with them. He knew while singing the hymn that he would sing for the rest of his life.

Career

Kid Wikkid (1983–1985)
The members of Kid Wikkid were based in Peterborough, Ontario. Upon hearing of the band and unaware of their ages, 14-year-old Bach auditioned for the group, and was hired by guitar player and band leader Jason Delorme. Kid Wikkid moved back to Toronto, and Bach's dad eventually allowed Bach to move in with an aunt.

Skid Row (1987–1996)

Skid Row initially formed in the mid-1980s with lead vocalist Matt Fallon fronting the group, and they began playing at various clubs around the New Jersey area. Fallon left the band in 1987, leaving Skid Row in search of a lead vocalist. Bach was spotted singing at rock photographer Mark Weiss's wedding by Jon Bon Jovi's parents, who subsequently approached him and suggested he get in touch with their son's friend, Dave Sabo, who was looking for a lead vocalist for his band. Bach was wary of joining another US-based band after briefly being a member of Detroit's Madam X. Upon hearing Skid Row's demo tapes, however, Bach flew to New Jersey to audition and became the up-and-coming band's lead vocalist in early 1987.

Skid Row achieved commercial success in the late 1980s and early 1990s, with its first two albums Skid Row (1989) and Slave to the Grind (1991) certified multi-platinum, the latter of which reached number one on the Billboard 200. The band's third album Subhuman Race (1995) was also critically acclaimed.

Bach has received criticism for a photo, taken in 1989, in which he is wearing a T-shirt reading "AIDS Kills Fags Dead", a play on the tagline at the time for the insecticide Raid, "Raid Kills Bugs Dead". In a 2003 interview, he stated about the controversy, "That was really stupid and wrong for me to wear that for one-half hour in my life. What nobody brings up is in 2000, when I was in 'Jekyll & Hyde,' and at an auction for Broadway Cares, I donated $12,000 of my own money to fight AIDS." 

Following disagreements over musical material and infuriating Bolan, Bach was fired from the band in 1996. However, rumors circulated that he had left the band due to his other band-mates believing they should not play as an opening act for Kiss. Band-mate Rachel Bolan also had a side project, a punk band Prunella Scales who were playing at the same time as the planned Kiss show. The rift between Bach and the other band members subsequently led to his leaving Skid Row. Four years later, Skid Row was one of the opening acts for the 2000 Kiss Farewell Tour, without Bach.

Broadway and other projects (1996–2006)
In 1993, Bach shortly toured with Triumph after the release of their album Edge of Excess, providing lead vocals up until the band broke up later the same year. 

In 1996, Bach joined The Last Hard Men, an alternative rock supergroup formed by Breeders lead guitarist Kelley Deal, which also included Frogs guitarist Jimmy Flemion and Smashing Pumpkins drummer Jimmy Chamberlin. The group recorded a full-length self-titled album for Atlantic Records, who then opted not to release it. In 1998 it was released on Kelley Deal's label, Nice Records, with no fanfare and a very limited pressing of 1,000 CDs. The band also recorded a cover of the Alice Cooper song "School's Out" for the soundtrack album of the 1996 film Scream.

In 1999, Bach released his debut solo album Bring 'Em Bach Alive!, his first release after his departure from Skid Row. Mainly a live album of Bach's Skid Row songs, it also presented five new studio recordings, including the single "Superjerk, Superstar, Supertears".

In 2000, Bach began performing in Broadway productions. He made his Broadway debut with the title role(s) in Jekyll & Hyde in April 2000. He also appeared as Riff Raff in The Rocky Horror Show in 2001. On November 28, 2001 Bach appeared at New York Steel, a benefit concert held in response to 9/11.

In early 2002, he became the host of VH1's Forever Wild. In October of that year, Bach was signed to perform in the national touring production of Jesus Christ Superstar, playing the title role alongside JCS veteran Carl Anderson.

A DVD video of live performances called Forever Wild was released in June 2004. That same year, he reprised the title role(s) in another showing of Jekyll & Hyde.

In 2003, Bach tried out for Velvet Revolver before the band found Scott Weiland, but was turned down because, according to Slash, "We sounded like Skid Roses!" From 2003 to 2007, Bach had a recurring role on the WB television show Gilmore Girls as "Gil", the lead guitarist in Lane Kim's band, Hep Alien. Members of Bach Tight Five (a project initiated by Bach in 2004, but dissolved shortly thereafter) lived with Bach and his family as documented on VH1's I Married ...Sebastian Bach, one of the "I Married ..." series. In 2005, Bach collaborated with Henning Pauly to be the singer on the Frameshift album called An Absence of Empathy, released in April 2005. He was recommended to Henning by Dream Theater's James LaBrie.

On May 12 and 14, 2006, at the Guns N' Roses' warmup show at the Hammerstein Ballroom in New York City, Bach joined Axl Rose on stage for the song "My Michelle"..... He joined Rose and the rest for a third time the following night (May 15) to sing "My Michelle" once again. He also joined them for their Pre-Download Festival show in the Apollo Hammersmith, London, singing My Michelle. Rose introduced Bach by saying that the two had rekindled their friendship in the previous week after 13 years of not speaking. On June 4, 9 & 11 he again joined Rose on stage at the 2006 Gods of Metal Festival (Milan), Download Festival in RDS Dublin and in Donington, respectively. On September 23, 2006, he joined Axl on stage once again at KROQ-FM's Inland Invasion festival in California for a rendition of "My Michelle".

Reality TV and Angel Down (2006–2010)
Bach starred in the 2006 VH1 reality show Supergroup, in which he, along with Ted Nugent, Scott Ian, Jason Bonham and Evan Seinfeld, were tasked with forming a heavy metal supergroup, with Bach as the lead vocalist. The seven-episode series was filmed during a twelve-day period when the musicians all lived together in a mansion in Las Vegas. The resulting band, originally called "Fist", was eventually named Damnocracy; both names were Bach's ideas. Damnocracy had no recorded output.

In 2007, Bach announced a partnership record label with EMI to jointly create a label owned by him, including his album Angel Down, which was released on November 20, 2007. Bach also recorded backing vocals for the track "Sorry" on Guns N' Roses' long-delayed Chinese Democracy, which was released in November 2008. He spent the summer of 2008 playing with Poison and Dokken.

He competed on the 2007 MTV reality show Celebrity Rap Superstar, coming in third place.

Bach was the winner of the second season of the CMT reality show Gone Country, which aired in 2008.

Kicking & Screaming and Sterling's departure (2010–2012)
Bach toured as an opening act for Guns N' Roses' "Chinese Democracy Tour" 2009–2010, and performed "My Michelle" with Axl Rose in Quebec City on February 1, 2010. On January 5, 2011, he was featured on NBC's Jimmy Fallon Show in a live performance and a subsequent video of "We Are The Ducks", a power ballad written for University of Oregon Ducks, set to play in the BCS national championship game Monday, January 10, 2011. In 2011, Bach was interviewed by British metalcore band Asking Alexandria in the March/April issue of Revolver. The band are fans of Skid Row and covered two of their songs the preceding year of the interview. The same year, Bach performed "Youth Gone Wild" with the band live at the Revolver Golden Gods Awards and Rock on the Range. Bach was also filmed in their music video "Closure".

Bach provided the voice of Prince Triton, King Neptune's rebellious son, in the SpongeBob SquarePants episode, "SpongeBob and the Clash of Triton" in 2010. On June 15, 2011, Bach revealed the title of his upcoming solo album would be Kicking & Screaming. On July 8, 2011 track list, cover art and title of the first single were revealed. It was released September 27, 2011 for North America and worldwide and September 23, 2011 for Europe on Frontiers Records. On August 13, 2012, Nick Sterling was fired by Bach after refusing to sign an agreement to appear on an undisclosed TV show.

Big Noize (2012–2013) 
Formed in 2007, Big Noize was an All-Star band consisting in founder member and drummer Vinny Appice (Black Sabbath, Dio, Heaven & Hell) plus other "monsters" such as guitarist Carlos Cavazo (Quiet Riot), later replaced by George Lynch (Dokken, Lynch Mob), bassist Phil Soussan (Ozzy Osbourne) and vocalist Joe Lynn Turner (Rainbow). Turner was replaced by Bach for the Kavarna Rock festival on July 14, 2012 and for a tour to South America, starting in Chile on July 9, 2013.

Give 'Em Hell (2013–present)

On April 30, 2013, Bach confirmed via Twitter that a new studio album was in the works. He went on to say that Bob Marlette would be returning as producer. Bach had collaboration work for the upcoming album with John 5, Duff McKagan, and Steve Stevens. On January 13, 2014, Give 'Em Hell was announced with a prospective release date of April 22, 2014. He also appeared in two Trailer Park Boys episodes from their 2014 season. In 2014, Bach completed his Give 'Em Hell tour and in 2015, Bach went on another tour titled the "18 and LIVE" tour.

In 2019, Bach toured behind the 30th anniversary of Skid Row's self-titled debut album, playing it live in its entirety. On July 20, 2021, it was announced that Bach would be doing a tour in the fall for the 30th anniversary of Skid Row's Slave to the Grind.

Personal life
At one time, Bach lived in Red Bank, New Jersey. In August 2011, his New Jersey home was damaged by Hurricane Irene and declared uninhabitable. Several Kiss and Skid Row artifacts (including Skid Row master tapes) were in the house, but none were damaged. His father's art, comic books, and the Kiss gargoyles from their 1979 tour were also salvaged.

In the mid-1980s, Bach began dating Maria Aquinar. The couple had a son, Paris, in 1988. Bach and Aquinar married in July 1992 and had another son, London, in 1994 and a daughter, Sebastiana, born in 2007. Bach and Aquinar split up in April 2010. 

In December 2010, Bach began dating model Minnie Gupta. They were engaged in April 2012 but ended their engagement in late 2014.

On December 28, 2014, Bach became engaged to Suzanne Le after two months of dating. They married in August 2015 and currently live in Los Angeles.

On July 13, 2017, Bach underwent "singing-related" hernia surgery. He started to recover a month later and then explained that the operation was needed, "because [he] literally screamed [his] guts out."

Solo band members

Current
 Sebastian Bach – vocals (1997–present)
 Rob De Luca – bass (2005–2012, 2014–present)
 Brent Woods – guitars (2014–present)
 Jeremy Colson - drums (2019–present)

Former

 Mark "Bam Bam" McConnell – drums (1997–2005)
 Jimmy Flemion – guitars (1997–1999)
 Larry Fisher– bass (1997–1999)
 Richie Scarlet – guitars (1998–2002)
 Anton Fig – drums (1998–2000)
 Paul Crook – guitars (1999–2004)
 Johnny Chromatic – guitars (2004–2014)
 Ralph Santolla – guitars (2004–2005)
 Randall X. Rawlings – guitars (2004–2005)
 Adam Albright – guitar (2004–2005)
 Cheeze (né Brian Hall) – bass (2004–2005)
 Mike Dover – drums (2004)
 Bobby Jarzombek – drums (2005–2019)
 "Metal" Mike Chlasciak – guitars (2005–2008)
 Steve Di Giorgio – bass (2005–2007)
 Nick Sterling – guitars (2009–2012)
 Jason Christopher – bass (2012–2014)
 Jeff George – guitars (2012–2013)
 Devin Bronson – guitars (2013–2014)

Discography

Bring 'Em Bach Alive! (1999)
Angel Down (2007)
Kicking & Screaming (2011) 
Give 'Em Hell (2014)

Filmography

Film

Television

Stage

References

External links

 
 
 
 

1968 births
21st-century Canadian male actors
Bahamian emigrants to Canada
Bahamian people of Norwegian descent
Canadian heavy metal singers
Canadian male television actors
Canadian people of Norwegian descent
Canadian rock singers
Glam metal musicians
Lakefield College School alumni
Living people
Male actors from Ontario
Musicians from Peterborough, Ontario
Participants in American reality television series
People from Freeport, Bahamas
People from Red Bank, New Jersey
Singing talent show winners
Skid Row (American band) members
Madam X (band) members
The Last Hard Men (band) members
Damnocracy members
Frontiers Records artists
Caroline Records artists
20th-century Canadian male singers
21st-century Canadian male singers